Adolf Karl Hubert Koch (9 April 1897 in Berlin – 2 July 1970) was a German educationalist and sports teacher. He was the founder of a gymnastics movement named after him and a pioneer of the Freikörperkultur (free body culture) movement in Germany in the 1920s and 1930s, which in turn was part of the larger Lebensreform movement.

Schooling and military service in the First World War
Koch's father Karl Koch, was a trained carpenter and firefighter. Koch had a sister a year and a half his junior. The family was Protestant. Koch grew up in what is now Kreuzberg in Berlin. After his school enrollment in 1902, Koch attended a Volksschule from 1903, after which he graduated in 1911. After finishing Volksschule, Koch entered a preparatory school in Kyritz. He broke off this teacher training in 1914 and volunteered for military service in the First World War. In the War service, Koch saw the opportunity to escape the constraints and the strict order of the like boarding school institute. Koch was installed as an army medical soldier. Koch was judged well for his service and decorated with a rather high distinction.

Teacher training, study of pedagogy and medicine
At the end of the First World War, Koch returned to Berlin and resumed teacher training in the spring of 1919, which he completed in autumn 1920 with the first state examination. Besides this training as a public school teacher, he also began studying pedagogy and medicine at the Royal Friedrich Wilhelm University (Königlichen Friedrich-Wilhelms-Universität). The focus of his studies was the subject of "hygiene", he also attended among other lectures the "physiology of women" by Fritz Albert Lipmann (Nobel Prize 1953), who taught in Berlin until 1931 and to whom Koch kept returning in later lectures.

Until 1919, Koch had no contact with the Freikörperkultur (free body culture). It was only with the subject of hygiene that he began to show interest in naturism. He read Freikörperkultur FKK-journals like Die Schönheit (The Beauty) and attended cabarets that included nude dancing. Here Koch was particularly fascinated by the expressiveness and elegance of the dancers Della de Waal.

Immediately after his teacher training (September 1920) Koch entered school service and became class teacher of the 4th girls' class at a Volksschule in the proletarian section of Berlin-Kreuzberg. This included putting the relationship between mind and body on a new basis. In Koch's opinion, physical education was being neglected by limiting itself to monotonous gymnastics. In addition, there was the lack of personal hygiene, which he complained:

 

For health reasons, Koch promoted daily body cleaning and dental hygiene, which was not a matter of course at the time. Koch started with small requirements: the daily cleaning of the fingernails. For this purpose, a classmate was chosen as the "cleaning commissioner", who inspected the hands and fingernails of her classmates every day. Dental care was added about a week later. The aim was to encourage the girls to practice basic hygiene every day – with visible success: clean, healthy and happy children.

Development of Koch-gymnastics
In 1921 Koch began gymnastics training at the  "School for Physical Education and Movement Education" (Schule für Körpererziehung und Bewegungsbildung) in Berlin-Charlottenburg. At this time, expressive dance, which aims to represent feelings and moods in movements, was just becoming fashionable. In addition, Koch dealt with the sometimes quite different gymnastics methods of Bess Mensendieck, Rudolf Bode, Émile Jaques-Dalcroze,  and the anthroposophical . Koch tended to do the exercises according to Dora Menzler, which, in his opinion, combined the advantages of the different gymnastics systems. For Koch, a successful physical education required the exercises to be done unclothed. Anna Müller-Herrmann and Dora Menzler were enthusiastic about this educational concept and supported Koch. As a schoolteacher, Koch saw nudity as a pedagogical activity that integrated the study of the body and the study of culture to create a kind of athletic intellectual and favoured the integration of all genders.

Koch's goal was now to develop a modern general physical and posture school (Körper- und Haltungsschule), with open style dance gymnastics according to Mary Wigman. Reinforced in particular by Anna Müller-Herrmann, Koch also developed exercises, especially for children. The joy of movement, the playful instincts and the fanciful imagination of the smaller children also poured into the exercises. For the older children, Koch developed work exercises that were based, among other things, on gravity and momentum.

It was important to Koch that boys and girls practice together because the children should also learn to respect the body of the opposite gender and learn that nudity in itself is not sexual. In 1923, Koch finished his training as a gymnastics teacher. At the Kreuzberg school in Berlin, Koch could not introduce the reform gymnastics he had developed; only on class school trips would pupils occasionally bathe nude in remote lakes, more not.

At the end of the school year 1920/21 Koch had to leave the school in central Berlin-Kreuzberg over the allegation Koch had inappropriately reached under the skirt of a girl. The medically trained Koch did not deny having touched the girl but spoke of a medical examination of the girl's abdomen. In fact, the girl was taken to the hospital with suspected appendicitis. Koch was nevertheless transferred, as a penalty, to a school in the east of Berlin, where it dealt with difficult-to-educate children.

First use of his method
Curiously, from this school transfer, it would be the first time Koch would come into contact with the Freikörperkultur (free body culture) social movement, that had existed in Berlin since shortly after 1900. Some of the parents of the school's pupils had formed a "friendship society" to do something for their body fitness in their free time; there were no formal statutes to this association. The children formed the group "Sun Land Youth Guild" (Jugendgilde Sonnenland). Koch now saw the opportunity to bring his reform gymnastics to this association. Parents and children gathered every Saturday in the youth club at Mariannenufer 1a for gymnastics. Initially, it was only a group of 10- to 13-year-old boys and girls, who together in the presence of their parents, did gymnastics nude.

At the end of 1922, Koch brought the gymnastics exercises into his school lessons with the children initially clothed wearing swimming trunks. The school's rector certified Koch that he was "particularly suitable for gymnastics lessons". Koch wanted to introduce nudity as an essential part of the exercises he developed. Since this was not possible in regular school time, Koch sought assistance from the parents of his pupils, where the initiative arose in June 1923 for establishing the "Parents Groups for Free Body Culture" (Elterngruppen für Freie Körperkultur). The parents also had to commit to complying with the basic hygienic rules, because Koch never lost sight of the subject of "hygiene". The school's classrooms and auditorium served as practice locations outside of school lesson times. Due to the increasing interest, these rooms were soon no longer sufficient.

This "new" form of gymnastics, in connection with Koch's conception of a natural way of life, Koch attempted to introduce into the school – with the consent of the parents. However, it wouldn't be long before his first process. The state was sympathetic to Koch's program until a woman visitor to the school made a loud public complaint against "nude dancing" in a state institution and the school authorities forbade Koch from doing any more nude exercises. Koch fought on, but drew his conclusions and resigned from the public school service and began to set up institutes for Free Body Culture (Institutes für Freikörperkultur).

Foundation of the Institute for Free Body Culture
In 1924, Koch founded the private remedial Physical Culture School Adolf Koch (Körperkulturschule Adolf Koch), with which he eventually built thirteen schools across Weimar Germany. In addition to gymnastics, the school program also included hydrotherapy, high-intensity heliotherapy, medical examinations and care, discussions on all problems and further education. The school management also included the well-known physician and sexologist Magnus Hirschfeld. Koch was unique in that he did not merely form a nudist organization but founded a nudist school.

Old documentaries from the Koch schools show families, adults, children and young people dancing, jumping and hopping nude through a room, acting according to Koch's instructions. Koch described the process as follows:

If, for example, I let girls and boys run free at the beginning of an hour, first one after the other, then forwards and backwards, then mixed up, that doesn't seem to make much sense, but for the individual, it is a playful reorientation in space, with and on the neighbour, an awakening of the sense of touch and, through the surprises, the twists and turns, joy in a few minutes. A precise sequence of our gymnastics lessons cannot be determined because there are no rigid forms of exercise. The focus is always on having fun and enjoying exercise. Of course, these relaxed gymnastics lessons can also be carried out in the great outdoors.

It was a significant step for the German Freikörperkultur (free body culture) movement of that time period. In Berlin, in addition to several Freikörperkultur FKK-associations founded around 1900, there was now Koch's institute located in Berlin's Friedrichstraße, and nude swimming and gymnastics took place in Berlin's communal swimming hall . In addition, Koch also had a stately site in Selchow with sports and playgrounds, a lake and barracks.

In 1929, Koch's Berlin school hosted the first "International Congress on Nudity", with participants from twenty-three countries. Koch also presided over a busy publishing program and edited the nudist journal Körperbildung/Nacktkultur (Physical Education/Nude Culture) 1928–1932, which, unlike other Freikörperkultur magazines reaching the public, stressed the idea of nudism as an indoor, classroom activity.

By 1930, Koch had schools in Berlin, Breslau, Barmen-Elberfeld (Wuppertal), Hamburg, Ludwigshafen, and Mannheim, with a total enrollment of 60,000. In the same year, Koch revealed the total enrollment in all German Freikörperkultur (FKK) organizations had reached more than 3 million. Koch's schools also offered four-year teaching certificates accredited by the German government.

Ban through National Socialism
The successes of Koch's schools were preceded by hard battles. Several judicial processes had been brought against Koch, set in motion by uptight moral apostles, but none resulted in a conviction (in the negative sense) or the closure of schools. The processes cost time and energy, but also made Koch known. Koch was harder hit by the total ban when the National Socialists came to power in 1933. His institutes were closed, also, because Koch refused to voluntarily part with his Jewish employees. His writings were on the list of "forbidden and un-German books" and publicly burned in the Nazi book burnings. Koch did not let himself be deterred, he continued to work illegally, founded two new institutes one after the other under different names and helped many Jews and other victims of Nazi persecution. During the Second World War, Koch was officially called up for military service as head of sports for the wounded and the follow-up treatment of the disabled in  near Berlin.

After the Second World War
After 1945, Koch immediately started building up a new institute, which the Senate of Berlin soon after recognized as an "open school facility" (Freie Schuleinrichtung). At this in 1946 new founded physical culture school Adolf Koch Institute (the Adolf-Koch-Institut) in Hasenheide in Berlin-Neukölln, Koch's second wife Irmgard (born 26 July 1923), who headed the institute together with Koch, also gave gymnastics lessons.

The German Association for Free Body Culture (DFK), to whom Koch's public relations recruitment work was considered too aggressive, distanced itself from Koch and excluded him from the association in 1964. During the Adenauer era, the DFK association tended to bow to public pressure, as the promotion of naturism was still considered by some as harmful to young people and immoral.

Koch died on 2 July 1970. One focus of his surviving wife Irmgard was advertising for nudist Freikörperkultur FKK-gymnastics, which is why she travelled a lot, for example to Switzerland and Hungary. In addition to the gymnastics lessons, which she instructed herself until 2003, she also gave lectures on health and nutrition. In 2003 Irmgard Koch withdrew from the institute and moved to her daughter in Sanitz (near Bad Doberan on the Baltic Sea coast). Koch's wife died there on 10 August 2009. In 1951 Koch's Berlin institute was replaced with the "Family Sport Association Adolf Koch" (Familien-Sport-Verein Adolf Koch e.V.) that still exists today.

Programmatic background
Koch is one of the pioneers of the nude culture, who stood for the international and humanistic currents of the Freikörperkultur (FKK) movement. In its beginnings, following a fashion trend of the late imperial era, this social movement was partly shaped by misinterpreted Darwinian ideas. Koch, on the other hand, came from a socialist, not the "Völkisch (ethnic)" tradition of the Freikörperkultur (free body culture). With the title of the magazine Koch published Wir sind nackt und nennen uns Du! (We are naked and call each other thou! [you]), Koch stood – based on the ideals of the Age of Enlightenment – as a motto-giver for the tendency towards egalitarian self-claims of undressed group life.

Selected books published
Körperbildung und Nacktkultur (Physical education and nude culture), Leipzig 1924
Nacktheit, Körperkultur und Erziehung. Ein Gymnastikbuch (Nudity, physical culture and upbringing. A gymnastics book), Leipzig 1929
Körperkultur und Erziehung (Physical culture and education), Berlin 1950

See also
Physical culture
Body culture studies

References

Bibliography

External links
Familien-Sport-Verein Adolf Koch e.V. (Family Sport Association Adolf Koch)

1890s births
1970 deaths
German naturists
German schoolteachers
Light therapy advocates
People associated with physical culture
People of Nazi Germany
People of the Weimar Republic
Social nudity advocates